

Hrotheweard (or Lodeward) was Archbishop of York starting some time between 904 and 928 and ending with his death in 931.

Citations

References

External links
 

931 deaths
Archbishops of York
10th-century English archbishops
Year of birth unknown